Double Circle may refer to:

Double Circle (anime), a 2013 Japanese original net animation
Double Circle (film), a 1963 Croatian film